Pleasant Grove, Arkansas may refer to the following communities:
Pleasant Grove, Craighead County, Arkansas, in Craighead County, Arkansas
Pleasant Grove, Stone County, Arkansas
Pleasant Grove, Union County, Arkansas
Pleasant Grove, Van Buren County, Arkansas
Pleasant Grove, Woodruff County, Arkansas